Counterfeit money is currency produced without the legal sanction of a state or government, usually in a deliberate attempt to imitate that currency and so as to deceive its recipient. Producing or using counterfeit money is a form of fraud or forgery, and is illegal. The business of counterfeiting money is nearly as old as money itself: plated copies (known as Fourrées) have been found of Lydian coins, which are thought to be among the first Western coins. Before the introduction of paper money, the most prevalent method of counterfeiting involved mixing base metals with pure gold or silver. Another form of counterfeiting is the production of documents by legitimate printers in response to fraudulent instructions. During World War II, the Nazis forged British pounds and American dollars. Today some of the finest counterfeit banknotes are called Superdollars because of their high quality and imitation of the real US dollar. There has been significant counterfeiting of Euro banknotes and coins since the launch of the currency in 2002, but considerably less than that of the US dollar.

Some of the ill-effects that counterfeit money has on society include a reduction in the value of real money; and an increase in prices (inflation) due to more money getting circulated in the economy—an unauthorized artificial increase in the money supply; a decrease in the acceptability of paper money; and losses, when traders are not reimbursed for counterfeit money detected by banks, even if it is confiscated. Traditionally, anti-counterfeiting measures involved including fine detail with raised intaglio printing on bills which allows non-experts to easily spot forgeries. On coins, milled or reeded (marked with parallel grooves) edges are used to show that none of the valuable metal has been scraped off.

History
Counterfeiting is sufficiently prevalent throughout history that it has been called "the world's second-oldest profession". Coinage of money began in the region of Lydia around 600 B.C. Before the introduction of paper money, the most prevalent method of counterfeiting involved mixing base metals with pure gold or silver. A common practice was to "shave" the edges of a coin. This is known as "clipping". Precious metals collected in this way could be used to produce counterfeit coinage. A fourrée is an ancient type of counterfeit coin, in which a base metal core has been plated with a precious metal to resemble its solid metal counterpart.

When paper money was introduced in China in the 13th century, wood from mulberry trees was used to make money. To control access to the paper, guards were stationed around mulberry forests, while counterfeiters were punished by death.

In the 13th century, Mastro Adamo was mentioned by Dante Alighieri as a counterfeiter of the Florentine fiorino, punished with death by hanging. The English couple Thomas and Anne Rogers were convicted on 15 October 1690 for "Clipping 40 pieces of Silver". Thomas Rogers was hanged, drawn, and quartered while Anne Rogers was burnt alive. Evidence supplied by an informant led to the arrest of the last of the English Coiners "King" David Hartley, who was executed by hanging in 1770. The extreme forms of punishment were meted out for acts of treason against the State or Crown rather than a simple crime.In the late eighteenth and early nineteenth centuries, Irish immigrants to London were particularly associated with the spending (uttering) of counterfeit money, while locals were more likely to participate in the safer and more profitable forms of currency crime, which could take place behind locked doors. These include producing the false money and selling it wholesale.

Similarly, in America, Colonial paper currency printed by Benjamin Franklin and others often bore the phrase "to counterfeit is death". Counterfeiting nevertheless became so prevalent by the early nineteenth century that contemporary accounts like those from author John Neal claimed that as much as half of the US currency in circulation was counterfeit. By the 1830s, American newspapers began listing instructions for identifying counterfeits. Because currency was issued by individual banks, there were approximately 5,400 types of counterfeit bills in the US by the 1860s.

Nations have used counterfeiting as a means of warfare. The idea is to overflow the enemy's economy with fake banknotes so that the real value of the money plummets. Great Britain did this during the American Revolutionary War to reduce the value of the Continental Dollar. The counterfeiters for the British were known as "shovers", presumably for the ability to "shove" the fake currency into circulation. Two of the most well-known shovers for the British during the Revolutionary War were David Farnsworth and John Blair. They were caught with 10,000 dollars in counterfeits when arrested. George Washington took a personal interest in their case and even called for them to be tortured to discover further information. They were eventually hanged for their crimes.

During the American Civil War, the Confederate States dollar was heavily counterfeited by private interests on the Union side, often without the sanction of the Union government in Washington. The Confederacy's access to modern printing technology was limited, while many Northern-made imitations were printed on high-quality banknote paper procured through extralegal means. As a result, counterfeit Southern notes were often equal or even superior in quality compared to genuine Confederate money.

In 1834, counterfeit copper coins manufactured in the United States were seized from several ships with American flags in Brazil. The practice appeared to end after.

Instances

A form of counterfeiting is the production of documents by legitimate printers in response to fraudulent instructions. An example of this is the Portuguese Bank Note Crisis of 1925, when the British banknote printers Waterlow and Sons produced Banco de Portugal notes equivalent in value to 0.88% of the Portuguese nominal Gross Domestic Product, with identical serial numbers to existing banknotes, in response to a fraud perpetrated by Alves dos Reis. Similarly, in 1929 the issue of postage stamps celebrating the millennium of Iceland's parliament, the Althing, was compromised by the insertion of "1" on the print order, before the authorized value of stamps to be produced (see Postage stamps and postal history of Iceland).

In December 1925 a high-profile counterfeit scandal came to light, when three people were arrested in the Netherlands while attempting to disseminate forged French 1000-franc bills which had been produced in Hungary. Subsequent investigations uncovered evidence that plot had received widespread support in Hungarian and German nationalist circles including the patronage of high ranking military and civilian officials. Twenty-four of the conspirators were tried in Budapest in May 1926. Most received light sentences in what is believed to have been a deliberate cover up by Hungarian Prime Minister István Bethlen. The affair facilitated the adoption of the International Convention for the Suppression of Counterfeiting Currency in April 1929 and formalized the role of the International Criminal Police Commission.

During World War II, the Nazis attempted to implement a similar plan (Operation Bernhard) against the Allies. The Nazis took Jewish artists to the Sachsenhausen concentration camp and forced them to forge British pounds and American dollars. The quality of the counterfeiting was very good, and it was almost impossible to distinguish between the real and fake bills. The Nazis were unable to carry out planned aerial drops of the counterfeits over Britain, so most notes were disposed of and not recovered until the 1950s.

Today some of the finest counterfeit banknotes are called Superdollars because of their high quality, and likeness to the real US dollar. The sources of such supernotes are disputed, with North Korea being vocally accused by US authorities. The amount of counterfeit United States currency is estimated to be less than $3 per $10,000, with less than $3 per $100,000 being difficult to detect.

There has been a rapid growth in the counterfeiting of euro banknotes and coins since the launch of the currency in 2002. In 2003, 551,287 fake euro notes and 26,191 bogus euro coins were removed from EU circulation. In 2004, French police seized fake €10 and €20 notes worth a total of around €1.8 million from two laboratories and estimated that 145,000 notes had already entered circulation.

In the early years of the 21st century, the United States Secret Service has noted a substantial reduction in the quantity of forged U.S. currency, as counterfeiters turn their attention towards the euro.

As a result of their rarity, gold and silver certificates have sometimes been erroneously flagged as counterfeits in the United States when they have, in fact, been genuine. Due to the fact that these banknotes carry significant numismatic value and are sought after by collectors, counterfeit examples have surfaced on eBay via unscrupulous sellers.

A batch of counterfeit A$50 and A$100 notes was released into the Australian city of Melbourne in July 2013. As of July 12, 2013, 40 reports had been made between the northern suburbs of Heidelberg and Epping. Police spokespersons explained to the public in media reports that the currency notes were printed on paper (Australia introduced polymer banknotes in 1988) and could be easily detected by scrunching up the note or tearing it. Additionally, the clear window within the notes was also an easy way to identify fake versions, as the "window appears to have been cut out with two clear plastic pieces stuck together with stars placed in the middle to replicate the Southern Cross". Police also revealed that fake notes had been seized in June 2013 in Melbourne's eastern and western suburbs. According to the Australian RBA figures, during 2014–15, the number of counterfeit $50 currency detected in circulation has more than doubled from the previous year, and more than 33,000 fake notes were removed from circulation. The officials believe this likely a fraction of the number of fake currencies currently flooding through in Victoria and NSW states. On 31 May 2016, the ACT police have warned people to keep an eye out for fake $50 notes, which is circulating throughout Canberra in recent months. The officers have been called out to more than 35 businesses over the past two months in connection to counterfeit $50 notes. Australian Federal Police have charged two persons alleging to have produced $16,465 notes of counterfeit currency and charged them with various offences under the Crimes (Currency) Act 1981. The police said that while Australian notes are hard to counterfeit, featuring many security features, they nonetheless urged people to take a close look each time they spend cash.

Effects on society

Some of the ill-effects that counterfeit money has on society include:
 Companies are not being reimbursed for counterfeits. This has led to companies losing buying power. As such, there is a reduction in the value of real money.
 Increase in prices (inflation) due to more money getting circulated in the economy—an unauthorized artificial increase in the money supply.
 A decrease in the acceptability (satisfactoriness) of money—payees may demand electronic transfers of real money or payment in another currency (or even payment in precious metals such as gold).

At the same time, in countries where paper money is a small fraction of the total money in circulation, the macroeconomic effects of counterfeiting of currency may not be significant. The microeconomic effects, such as confidence in the currency, however, may be large.

Anti-counterfeiting measures

Traditionally, anti-counterfeiting measures involved including fine detail with raised intaglio printing on bills which would allow non-experts to easily spot forgeries. On coins, milled or reeded (marked with parallel grooves) edges are used to show that none of the valuable metal has been scraped off. This detects the shaving or clipping (paring off) of the rim of the coin. However, it does not detect sweating, shake coins in a bag, and collect the resulting dust. Since this technique removes a smaller amount, it is primarily used on the most valuable coins, such as gold. In early paper money in Colonial North America, one creative means of deterring counterfeiters was to print the impression of a leaf in the bill. Since the patterns found in a leaf were unique and complex, they were nearly impossible to reproduce.

In the late twentieth century, advances in computer and photocopy technology made it possible for people without sophisticated training to copy currency easily. In response, national engraving bureaus began to include new, more sophisticated anti-counterfeiting systems such as holograms, multi-colored bills, embedded devices such as strips, raised printing, microprinting, watermarks, and color-shifting inks whose colors changed depending on the angle of the light, and the use of design features such as the "EURion constellation" which disables modern photocopiers. Software programs such as Adobe Photoshop have been modified by their manufacturers to obstruct manipulation of scanned images of banknotes. There also exist patches to counteract these measures.

Recently, there has been a discovery of new tests that could be used on U.S. Federal Reserve Notes to ensure that the bills are authentic. These tests are done using intrinsic fluorescence lifetime. This allows for the detection of counterfeit money because of the significance in difference of fluorescence lifetime when compared to authentic money.

For U.S. currency, anti-counterfeiting milestones are as follows:
 1990 Microprinting and a security thread are introduced on U.S. currency 
 1996 $100 bill gets a new design with a larger portrait
 1997 $50 bill gets a new design with a larger portrait
 1998 $20 bill gets a new design with a larger portrait
 2000 $10 bill and $5 bill get a new design with a larger portrait
 2003 $20 bill gets a new design with no oval around Andrew Jackson's portrait and more colors
 2004 $50 bill gets a new design with no oval around Ulysses S. Grant's portrait and more colors
 2006 $10 bill gets a new design with no oval around Alexander Hamilton's portrait and more colors
 2008 $5 bill gets a new design with no oval around Abraham Lincoln's portrait and more colors
 2010 $100 bill gets a new design with no oval around Benjamin Franklin's portrait and more colors; along with the inclusion of the new "3D security ribbon"

The redesigned $100 bill was unveiled on April 21, 2010, and the Federal Reserve Board was to begin issuing the new bill on February 10, 2011, but the release was delayed due to printing problems until October 2013.

The Treasury had made no plans to redesign the $5 bill using colors but recently reversed its decision after learning some counterfeiters were bleaching the ink off the bills and printing them as $100 bills. The new $10 bill (the design of which was revealed in late 2005) entered circulation on March 2, 2006. The $1 bill and $2 bill are seen by most counterfeiters as having too low a value to counterfeit, and so they have not been redesigned as frequently as higher denominations.

In the 1980s, counterfeiting in the Republic of Ireland twice resulted in sudden changes in official documents: in November 1984, the £1 postage stamp, also used on savings cards for paying television licences and telephone bills, was invalidated and replaced by another design at a few days' notice, because of widespread counterfeiting. Later, the £20 Central Bank of Ireland Series B banknote was rapidly replaced because of what the Finance Minister described as "the involuntary privatization of banknote printing".

In the 1990s, the portrait of Chairman Mao Zedong was placed on the banknotes of the People's Republic of China to combat counterfeiting, as he was recognised better than the generic designs on the renminbi notes.

In 1988 the Reserve Bank of Australia released the world's first long-lasting and counterfeit-resistant polymer (plastic) banknotes with a special Bicentennial $10 note issue. After problems with this bill were discovered and addressed, in 1992, a problem-free $5 note was issued. In 1996 Australia became the first country to have a full series of circulating polymer banknotes.
On 3 May 1999, the Reserve Bank of New Zealand started circulating polymer banknotes printed by Note Printing Australia Limited. The technology developed is now used in 24 countries. As of 2009, Note Printing Australia was printing polymer notes for 18 countries.

The Swiss National Bank had a reserve series of notes for the Swiss franc in case widespread counterfeiting were to take place; this was discontinued in the mid-1990's with the introduction of the eighth series of banknotes.

Penalties by country for creating counterfeit money

Notable counterfeiters

 Peter Alston was the late-18th-century and early-19th-century counterfeiter and river pirate, who is believed to be Little Harpe's associate and partner in the murder of notorious outlaw leader Samuel Mason in 1803
 Philip Alston was an 18th-century counterfeiter both before and after the American Revolution in Virginia and the Carolinas before the war, and later in Kentucky and Illinois afterward.
 Anatasios Arnaouti, a British counterfeiter of more than £2.5 million in fake money, was sentenced in 2005.
 Edward Bonney, an alleged counterfeiter in northern Indiana who escaped to Nauvoo, Illinois, was a bounty hunter and amateur detective who posed as a counterfeiter to apprehend the murderers of Colonel George Davenport and infiltrate the Midwestern Banditti of the Prairie. 
 Abel Buell, an American colonialist and republican who went from altering five-pound note engraving plates to publishing the first map of the new United States created by an American.
 Mary Butterworth, a counterfeiter in colonial America.
 William Chaloner, a British counterfeiter, was convicted by Sir Isaac Newton and hanged on 16 March 1699.
 Mike DeBardeleben, a convicted kidnapper, rapist, and suspected serial killer, was sent to prison for counterfeiting the $20 bill.
 Alves dos Reis, who by the end of 1925 had managed to introduce escudo banknotes worth £1,007,963 at 1925 exchange rates into the Portuguese economy, which was equivalent to 0.88% of Portugal's nominal GDP at the time.
 John Duff was a counterfeiter, hunter, and soldier who served in George Rogers Clark's campaign to capture the Illinois country, for the Patriot American side, during the Revolutionary War.
 Eric "Klipping" V, the king of Denmark (1259–1286). The king's nickname refers to "clipping" of the coin.
 David Farnsworth was a British Loyalist American counterfeiter and spy in the American Revolutionary War. He was hanged for his crimes after George Washington had taken a personalised interest in his case.

 Francis Greenway was an English-born architect transported to Australia in 1814 as a convict for the crime of forgery, where he rose as a prominent planner of public buildings. He later posthumously became probably the only forger to be depicted on a banknote, the Australian $10.
 "King" David Hartley was the leader of the Cragg Vale Coiners of rural 18th-century England. Producing fake gold coins, he was eventually captured and hanged at Tyburn near York on April 28, 1770, and buried in the village of Heptonstall, W Yorks. His brother, Isaac, escaped the authorities and lived until 1815.
Thomas McAnea, also known as Hologram Tam, a Scottish master counterfeiter regarded as one of the most skillful in Europe with regard to banknote security holograms.
 Emerich Juettner, documented in Mister 880, was possibly the longest uncaught counterfeiter in history. For ten or more years, he eluded government authorities while he printed and spent fake $1 bills in his New York neighborhood.
 Catherine Murphy, convicted of coining in 1789 and was the last woman to suffer execution by burning in England.
 John A. Murrell, a near-legendary bandit, operating in the United States along the Mississippi River in the mid-nineteenth century. Convicted for his crimes in the Circuit Court of Madison County, Tennessee, Murrell was incarcerated in the Tennessee State Penitentiary, modeled after the Auburn penal system, from 1834 to 1844.
 King Philip the Fair of France (1268–1314) caused riots and was known as "the counterfeiter king" for emitting coinage that was debased compared to the standards that had been prevalent during the half-century previous to his reign.
 Charles Price (Old Patch) (died 1787), prolific English counterfeiter and swindler who defrauded the Bank of England of £200,000
 Sturdivant Gang, a multi-generational group of American counterfeiters whose criminal activities took place over a 50-year period from Colonial Connecticut to the Illinois frontier.
 Samuel C. Upham, the first known counterfeiter of Confederate money during the American Civil War. His activities began or became known in early July 1862.
 Wesley Weber, imprisoned in 2001 for counterfeiting the Canadian one-hundred-dollar bill.
 Arthur Williams, imprisoned in 2007 for counterfeiting the United States one-hundred-dollar bill.

Money art
Money art is a subject related to counterfeiting that incorporates currency designs or themes. Some of these works of art are similar enough to actual bills that their legality is in question. While a counterfeit is made with deceptive intent, money art is not; however, the law may or may not differentiate between the two. J. ⁠ S. ⁠ G. ⁠ Boggs was an American artist best known for his hand-drawn, one-sided copies of US banknotes, which he sold for the face value of the note.

Parodies of banknotes, often produced for humorous, satirical or promotional purposes, are called 'skit notes'. (The term 'skit note' has been used since around the mid-19th century. Prior to that, the term 'flash note' was used.)

The street artist Banksy is known for making 10-pound notes that feature Princess Diana's portrait in place of Queen Elizabeth II, while "Bank of England" is replaced by "Banksy of England". The artist's original intent was to throw them off a building, but after some of the notes were dropped at a festival, he discovered that they could pass for legal tender and changed his mind. As of 2012, Banksy is still in possession of all one hundred million pounds' worth of the currency.

In 2006, American artist Jack Daws hired metalsmiths to make a mold of a 1970 U.S. penny and cast it in 18-karat gold. He then hired another metalsmith to copper-plate it, after which it looked like an ordinary penny. On March 28, 2007, Daws intentionally put the "penny" in circulation at Los Angeles International Airport (LAX). The sculpture was discovered in Brooklyn two-and-a-half years later by Jessica Reed, a graphic designer and coin collector, who noticed it while paying for groceries at a local store. Reed eventually communicated with Daws' Seattle art dealer, the Greg Kucera Gallery, and Daws confirmed that she had discovered the Counterfeit Penny sculpture.

Training money
In May 2017, Australian currency training notes (used in-house by Chinese banks in the training of bank tellers) were circulated briefly in Darwin, Northern Territory, with seven cases reported by the Northern Territory Police of notes being offered and taken as real money. The $100 (Australian dollar) notes had Chinese language characters printed on them but otherwise had the color and feel of real notes, and the Chinese characters can be disguised when the note is folded. They had been sold through eBay, with the disclaimer of not being for circulation. China also has an equivalent $50 (U.S. dollar) "training money", that has previously appeared in the USA.

See also

 3D printed firearm
 Copyright infringement
 Counterfeit banknote detection pen
 Federal Bureau of Investigation
 International Convention for the Suppression of Counterfeiting Currency
 Money laundering
 Organized crime
 Russian mafia
 Triad (organized crime)
 Money
 Digital currency
 World currency

References

External links

 
 
Numismatics
Deception